The Discography of the artist Michael "Clip" Payne.

1970s

1975
Parliament - Chocolate City (Casablanca) (LP)    Drums & Percussion (Credited as "Man in the Box")

1978
Funkadelic - One Nation Under A Groove (Warner Bros.) (LP)    Vocals

1978
Parliament - Motor Booty Affair (Casablanca) (LP)    Vocals

1979 
Funkadelic - Uncle Jam Wants You (Warner Bros.) (LP)    Vocals
Parliament - Gloryhallastoopid (or Pin the Tail on the Funky) (Casablanca NBP-7195) (LP) Choir, Chorus

1980s

1980 
Parliament - Trombipulation (Casablanca) (LP) Vocals

1983 
P-Funk All Stars - Urban Dancefloor Guerillas (CBS Records) (LP) Vocals
George Clinton - You Shouldn't-Nuf Bit Fish (Capitol) (LP) Synthesizer, Bass, Vocals (background), Rhythm Arrangements

1985 
George Clinton - Some of My Best Jokes Are Friends (Capitol) (LP) Vocals (background)

1989 
George Clinton George Clinton Presents Our Gang Funky (MCA Records) (CD) Vocals

1990s

1990 
P-Funk All Stars - Live at the Beverly Theatre in Hollywood (Westbound Records Us) (CD) Vocals
Prince - Graffiti Bridge (Warner Bros./Paisley Park) (CD) George Clinton, Garry Shider, Steve Boyd, Joseph "Amp" Fiddler, Tracey "Treylewd" Lewis, Michael "Clip" Payne, and Belita Woods

1991 
T.C. Ellis - True Confessions (Warner Bros./Paisley Park) (CD) George Clinton, Mallia Franklin, Michael "Clip" Payne, Garry Shider, Belita Woods, Paul Hill, Joseph "Amp" Fiddler, and Patricia Lewis

1992 
Trey Lewd - Drop The Line (Reprise) (CD) Vocals, Drum Programming 
Pochette Surprise (1992) Interpretation
Parliament - Greatest Hits 1972-1993   Percussion, Vocals, Vocals (background), Bullhorn
Rockets - Another Future ([Polydor]) (CD) Vocals, Backing vocals

1994 
P-Funk Guitar Army - Tribute To Jimi Hendrix Vol. 1 (P-Vine) (CD)

1995 
Parliament - Best of Parliament: Give Up the Funk Vocals (background)
Funkcronomicon (Axiom) (CD) Vocals
Parliament Funkadelic P Funk Allstars - Dope Dog (One Nation Records) (CD) Organ, Synthesizer, Bass, Guitar, Percussion, Drums, Vocals
P-Funk All Stars - Hydraulic Funk (CD) Vocals

1996 
George Clinton & The P-Funk Allstars - T.A.P.O.A.F.O.M. (Epic/550 Music) (CD) Vocals 
Enemy Squad - "Bob Dole Is on Drugs"/"If It Fits" (12") Gabe Gonzalez, Michael "Clip" Payne, Steve Boyd, Belita Woods, and George Clinton

1997 
Enemy Squad - United State Of... Mind (Tuf America Records) (CD) DeWayne "Blackbyrd" McKnight, Joseph "Amp" Fiddler, Michael "Clip" Payne, Steve Boyd, Belita Woods, Louie "Babblin'" Kababbie, Gabe Gonzalez, and  George Clinton
Enemy Squad - "Return of the Swamp Thang"/"Prankster Boogie" (Tuf America Records) (12")

1998 
Various - Lost in Bass (Aim Records) Vocals (background), Drum Programming, Mixing
Alex Gopher - You, My Baby & I (V2 Records) Vocals

1999 
Tony Allen - Black Voices Vocals
Cacophonic FM - After The Smoke Cleared (WEFUNK Records And Filmworks 2K AD-1) (CD)

2000s

2000 
Funkadelic - Complete Recordings 1976-81

2001 
Drugs - The Prescription For Mis-America (WEFUNK Records And Filmworks) (CD)
Bootsy Collins Glory B da Funk's on Me!: The Bootsy Collins Anthology (Rhino) Vocals
420 Funk Mob LIVE ON THE OFF DAYS(WEFUNK Records And Filmworks) (CD)

2002 
Parliament - Funked Up: The Very Best of Parliament Vocals (background)
Various Artists - My House in Montmartre Vocals (background)

2003 
Red Hot Chili Peppers - Freaky Styley (Bonus Tracks) Vocals (background)
Various Artists - Minimal Funk, Vol. 3 
George Clinton - Six Degrees of P-Funk: The Best of George Clinton & His Funky Family

2004
Killa Will - All in the Game Producer, Engineer, Mixing
University of Kentucky Mega Sax Ensemble - Full English Mower in the Bluegrass  Sax (Tenor)

2005 
420 Funk Mob LIVE IN SPAIN (Wefunk Ad2k Recordings & Filmworks)
Danny Bedrosian - Som'n Fierce (BOZFONK MOOSICK) (CD) Garry Shider, Lige Curry, and Michael "Clip" Payne
Parliament - Gold  Vocals (background)
The P-Funk All Stars - How Late Do U Have 2 B B 4 U R Absent? Producer
George Clinton & Parliament Funkadelic - Live at Montreux 2004  [DVD] Vocals

2006 
Daryl Hall & John Oates - Home for Christmas  Guitar (Acoustic), Guitar (Electric)

2007 
Cacophonic FM - Funky NY Jazz

2008 
Stoney Clove Lane - Stay with Me Clapping

2009 
Danny Bedrosian and Secret Army-MUZZLE MOOSICK Features Danny Bedrosian, Garry Shider, Lige Curry, Rico Lewis, Dewayne "Blackbyrd" Mcknight, Michael "Clip" Payne

2010 
420 Funk Mob - Screamin' for More (Wefunk Ad2k Recordings & Filmworks)

2016 
Susanne Alt - Saxify (Venus Tunes) Vocals

References

[ Allmusic Discography]

Discographies of American artists
Rhythm and blues discographies